Laurel Springs is an unincorporated community in Alleghany County, North Carolina, United States. The Blue Ridge Parkway also crosses the center of the community. Laurel Springs has a post office with ZIP code 28644.

The Robert L. Doughton House was listed on the National Register of Historic Places in 1979.

References

Unincorporated communities in Alleghany County, North Carolina
Unincorporated communities in North Carolina